Houstonia parviflora, the few-flowered bluet or Greenman's bluet, is a plant species in the Rubiaceae, found only in south-central Texas.

References

External links
Gardening Europe, Houstonia parviflora Hedyotis greenmanii
Lady Bird Johnson Wildflower Center, Native Plant Database

parviflora
Endemic flora of Texas
Plants described in 1897
Flora without expected TNC conservation status